Welspun Maxsteel Ltd. is an Indian steel company. It is located near Salav village in Murud taluka.

History 

Welspun Maxsteel Ltd. was formed on 22 May 2009 after Welspun Steel Ltd. completed the acquisition of Vikram Ispat, the sponge iron division business of Grasim Industries Ltd. Now part of the US$3 billion Welspun Group, the facility was set up in 1989 with design capacity of 0.75 million tons of Sponge Iron in the form of hot briquetted iron and an initial investment of Rs. 525 crore.

In August 2014, JSW Steel Ltd acquired Welspun Maxsteel Ltd in a deal valued at around 1,000 crores.

Steel facility 

Spread across 435 acres of land with a captive Port, the facility is located in the scenic beaches of Salav village in Raigad district of Maharashtra. The facility today boasts of being the only natural gas-based DRI plant for merchant sale in India with a turnover of Rs. 1302 crore (FY2009-10). The Company currently has a work force of more than 550 employees and has an installed capacity of 9 lakh ton per annum.

References

External links
Welspun raises INR 700 crore for Vikram Ispat buy
Vikram Ispat gets IDBI guarantee for Rs500 cr
Welspun Maxsteel were willing to pay USD 4.75 to USD 5.25 per million British thermal unit for KG-D6 gas
GMR Energy and Welspun Maxsteel for purchase of additional KG-D6 gas
RIL suggests customers willing to pay more for D6 gas

Manufacturing companies based in Mumbai
Steel companies of India
Welspun Group
Manufacturing companies established in 1989
1989 establishments in Maharashtra